Askam is a village in Hanover Township, Luzerne County, Pennsylvania.

The Askam Borehole is located near Askam, Pennsylvania.

Geography of Luzerne County, Pennsylvania